Skole Raion was a raion in Lviv Oblast in western Ukraine. Its administrative center was Skole. The raion was abolished on 18 July 2020 as part of the administrative reform of Ukraine, which reduced the number of raions of Lviv Oblast to seven. The area of Skole Raion was merged into Stryi Raion.

It was established in 1940.

At the time of disestablishment, the raion consisted of three hromadas:
 Kozova rural hromada with the administration in the selo of Kozova;
 Skole urban hromada with the administration in Skole;
 Slavske settlement hromada with the administration in the urban-type settlement of Slavske.

People from Skole Raion 
 Petro Jacyk, born in Verkhnie Synovydne — a Ukrainian Canadian businessman and philanthropist.

Gallery

References

Former raions of Lviv Oblast
1940 establishments in Ukraine
Ukrainian raions abolished during the 2020 administrative reform